This is a list of notable shopping centres in South Africa with the aim of including all (and only) shopping centres with at least two anchor stores such as hypermarkets, supermarkets, department stores, or multicinemas, or which are otherwise notable.

GLA = Gross leasable area. The names of the central settlement (e.g. Pretoria, Bloemfontein, Durban) are mentioned in the section titles only for the convenience of international readers who may not be familiar with the names of the Metropolitan Cities (e.g. Tshwane, Mangaung, eThekwini).

North West

Eastern Cape

Buffalo City incl. East London

Nelson Mandela Bay incl. Port Elizabeth

Sarah Baartman Region

Transkei

Western Cape

City of Cape Town

Cape Winelands

Garden Route

Gauteng

East Rand

Johannesburg

City of Tshwane incl. Pretoria

West Rand

Mpumalanga

Free State

Mangaung incl. Bloemfontein

Limpopo

Polokwane

Mopane

Northern Cape

Kwa-Zulu Natal

eThekwini incl. Durban

Midlands

Newcastle

Pietermaritzburg

Southern KwaZulu Natal

References
 list of shopping malls in the city, Johannesburg municipal website
 Full list of all the malls in South Africa, with relevant mall and store information

 
South Africa
Shopping centres
Shopping centres